Vil-Zhukova is a rural locality (a village) in Verkh-Invenskoye Rural Settlement, Kudymkarsky District, Perm Krai, Russia. The population was 27 as of 2010. There is one street.

Geography 
Vil-Zhukova is located 33 km west of Kudymkar (the district's administrative centre) by road. Kharinova is the nearest rural locality.

References 

Rural localities in Kudymkarsky District